This article lists political parties in Guinea-Bissau. 
Guinea-Bissau has a multi-party system with numerous political parties, in which no one party often has a chance of gaining power alone, and parties must work with each other to form coalition governments.

Active parties

Parliamentary parties

Other parties
United Social Democratic Party (PUSD)
Green Party (LIPE)
Democratic Socialist Party (PDS)
Democratic Social Front (FDS)
Resistance of Guinea-Bissau-Bafatá Movement (RGB-MB)
National Unity Party (PUN)
United People's Alliance (APU)
National Union for Democracy and Progress (UNDP)
Workers' Party (PT)
Manifest Party of the People (PMP)
Socialist Party of Guinea-Bissau (PSGB)
Guinean Democratic Movement
Guinean Civic Forum–Social Democracy (FCG/SD)
Guinean People's Party (PPG)
Democratic Convergence Party (PCD)
Republican Party for Independence and Development (PRID)
Social Democratic Party (PSD)
Movemento Patriotico  (MP)

See also
 Politics of Guinea-Bissau

References 

Guinea-Bissau
 
Guinea-Bissau
Political parties
Parties